Vasilios Pelkas (born 16 October 1999) is a Greek professional footballer who plays as an attacking midfielder for Super League 2 club Almopos Aridea.

Personal life
Pelkas' cousin, Dimitrios, is also a professional footballer.

References

1999 births
Living people
Greek footballers
Football League (Greece) players
Gamma Ethniki players
Trikala F.C. players
Footballers from Giannitsa
Association football midfielders